, also known as Onomiya-dono, was a Japanese statesman, courtier and politician during the Heian period.

Career
He was a minister during the reigns of Emperor Reizei and Emperor En'yū.
 May 4, 944 (Tengyō 7, 9th day of the 4th month): Saneyori was elevated to the position of udaijin in the Imperial court hierarchy.
 May 19, 947 (Tenryaku 1, 26th day of the 4th month): Saneyori is promoted to the positions of sadaijin and grand general of the left.
 949 (Tenryaku 3, 1st month): Saneyori and his brother Morosuke shared the duties of daijō-daijin during a period of Fujiwara no Tadahira's ill-health.
 958 (Tentoku 2, 3rd month): Saneyori was granted special permission to travel in a wheeled vehicle.
 March 26, 963 (Ōwa 3, 28th day of the 2nd month): Saneyori presided at the coming of age ceremonies for Norihira-shinnō (憲平親王) who would later become Emperor Reizei.
 July 31, 967 (Kōhō 4, 22nd day of the 6th month): Saneyori began serving as kampaku when Emperor Reizei assumed the throne in 967.
 September 27, 969 (Anna 2, 13th day of the 8th month): Saneyori was appointed sesshō (regent). 
 June 24, 970 (Tenroku 1, 18th day of the 5th month): Saneyori died at age 70; and he was posthumously elevated to the first class in rank.

After his death, Saneyori's nephew Koretada assumed his duties when he was named sesshō after his death.

Genealogy
This member of the Fujiwara clan was the son of Fujiwara no Tadahira. Saneyori was the eldest son. He had two brothers: Morosuke and Morotada.

Notes

References
 Brinkley, Frank and Dairoku Kikuchi. (1915). A History of the Japanese People from the Earliest Times to the End of the Meiji Era. New York: Encyclopædia Britannica. OCLC 413099
 Nussbaum, Louis-Frédéric and Käthe Roth. (2005).  Japan encyclopedia. Cambridge: Harvard University Press. ;  OCLC 58053128
 Titsingh, Isaac. (1834). Nihon Odai Ichiran; ou,  Annales des empereurs du Japon.  Paris: Royal Asiatic Society, Oriental Translation Fund of Great Britain and Ireland. OCLC 5850691

900 births
970 deaths
Fujiwara clan
Regents of Japan